Goya's Ghosts is a 2006 biographical drama film, directed by Miloš Forman (his final directorial feature before his death in 2018), and written by him and Jean-Claude Carrière. The film stars Javier Bardem, Natalie Portman, and Stellan Skarsgård, and was filmed on location in Spain during late 2005. The film was written, produced, and performed in English although it is a Spanish production.

Although the historical setting of the film is authentic, the story about Goya trying to defend a model is fictional, as are the characters Brother Lorenzo and the Bilbatúa family.

Plot

In 1792, Spain suffers amid upheaval from the French Revolution. Francisco Goya is a renowned painter who does portraits as the Official Court Painter to Spain's royalty, among others.

The Spanish Inquisition is disturbed by some of Goya's work. Brother Lorenzo Casamares defends him and later hires him to paint his portrait.  Lorenzo says that his works are not evil, but simply depict evil. He recommends that the Church/Inquisition step up against anti-Catholic practices, and he is given power to intensify the Inquisition.

While posing for Goya, Lorenzo sees a painting and asks about the model he uses, Inés, the daughter of rich merchant Tomás Bilbatúa. Later, Inés is spotted in a tavern by Holy Office spies (trained by Lorenzo) declining a dish of pork.  She is summoned by the Inquisition and arrested on charges of "Judaizing" by refusing pork. She is stripped naked and tortured by strappado (put to The Question) into a confession and then imprisoned.

Her father begs Goya for help, who in turn asks Lorenzo to learn about Inés's situation. Lorenzo finds her naked in the dungeon, feigning to help her and pass a message to her family. He covers her up and offers to pray with her, but struggles with his desire for her. She prays with him at his request.

Later, at a dinner in Bilbatúa's home where he and Goya are guests, Lorenzo defends strappado (The Question). He argues that if the accused is innocent, God will give him or her the strength to deny guilt; therefore, a person who confesses under duress must be guilty. Bilbatúa does not agree and argues that people will confess to anything under torture, to which Goya also agrees.

Bilbatúa then draws up a document which says that Lorenzo confesses to being a monkey, and with the help of his sons, tortures Lorenzo in the same manner, causing him to break down and sign it. Bilbatúa promises to destroy the document if Inés is released. He gives Lorenzo a large gold 'donation' for the Church in the hopes it may persuade the Holy Office to release her.

Lorenzo pleads for Inés, and the Inquisitor-General Father Gregorio accepts the money, but refuses her release, since she has confessed. Lorenzo again visits Inés, offering to pray with her, but instead rapes her. Later, her father brings the document to the king, Charles IV who is amused at reading it and promises to look into Inés' situation. The document is an embarrassment to the Holy Office, and Lorenzo flees when they come to arrest him. His portrait is confiscated and publicly burned in effigy.

Fifteen years pass, and a now deaf Goya is at the height of his creativity. The French army invades Spain, abolishes the Inquisition and sets the prisoners free. Lorenzo had fled to France, and is now a fanatical adherent of the French Revolution. He has become Napoleon's chief prosecutor against his Inquisition ex-colleagues (This twist in Lorenzo's allegiance may have been inspired by Juan Antonio Llorente.). A French show trial court convicts and sentences the Inquisitor-General to death.

Left in the dungeons over the years, Inés has been losing her sanity. She gave birth to a daughter who was taken away at birth. Upon returning home and finding her family dead, Inés turns to Goya for help in finding her child. Lorenzo is the father, which is embarrassing for him, and he sends Inés to an insane asylum. Lorenzo questions the condemned Inquisitor-General, who tells him that a child born in the dungeon would've been placed at an orphanage. Lorenzo finds her and learns from the nuns that his daughter, Alicia, had run away several years prior.

While sketching in Garden Park, Goya notices a prostitute named Alicia who looks just like Inés. He goes to Lorenzo and asks for Inés, so he can reunite her with her daughter. Lorenzo becomes worried and secretly visits Alicia at the park, offering to pay her passage to America if she leaves Spain. She refuses, calling him insane. Meanwhile, Goya visits the asylum where Lorenzo had stashed Inés and bribes the director to release her. He attempts to bring her to see Alicia at a tavern where prostitutes gather. As he tries to persuade Alicia, soldiers (on Lorenzo's orders) raid the place and arrest all the prostitutes. Goya learns that Lorenzo plans to sell them as slaves to America.

Soon after, the deluded Inés wanders into the tavern and finds a baby left by its mother, who was taken in the raid. She is elated and steals the baby away thinking it's her lost child.

The British are easily defeating the French with help from the Spanish populace.  They come over a hill and charge the wagons transporting the prostitutes. The French escort abandons the wagons, and Alicia catches the eye of a British officer. Lorenzo is caught fleeing the invasion, and Spain has reinstated the Inquisition.  Lorenzo is sentenced to death, with the Inquisitor-General reversing their earlier roles. He urges Lorenzo to repent as he is taken to the execution wearing a sanbenito with painted flames, indicating that he is sentenced to hell.

On the scaffold, Lorenzo sees Alicia, next to the British officer, scoffing at him. He also sees Goya sketching the scene at a distance. Inés is also in the crowd, and she calls to Lorenzo, showing him the baby she thinks is their daughter. Refusing to repent despite pleas from his former colleagues, Lorenzo is garroted. The film ends with a cart taking Lorenzo's body away, escorted by Inés still carrying the child, with Goya following behind and calling for her. She glances back with a smile, but continues to accompany Lorenzo's body.

Cast
 Natalie Portman as Inés Bilbatúa and Alicia
 Javier Bardem as Lorenzo Casamares
 Stellan Skarsgård as Francisco Goya
 Michael Lonsdale as the Inquisitor General Father Gregorio
 Randy Quaid as King Charles IV
 Blanca Portillo as Queen María Luisa
 José Luis Gómez as Tomás Bilbatúa
 Mabel Rivera as María Isabel Bilbatúa
 Unax Ugalde as Ángel Bilbatúa
 Fernando Tielve as Álvaro Bilbatúa
 Julian Wadham as Joseph Bonaparte

Production
Actual Goya paintings were used in the film, except for those which were supposed to resemble Bardem and Portman. Close-ups of Goya's hands creating his paintings used an actual artist. 

Bardem said he first believed he should have been cast as Goya, but then realized Lorenzo was a "wonderful challenge because he embodies two entirely opposite behaviors."

Skarsgard wore a fat suit at first but enjoyed the food so much he gained enough weight for the role later. 

When getting ready to cast Inés, Forman saw Portman on a magazine cover and noticed how much she looked like The Milkmaid of Bordeaux.

Reception

Box office
The film has grossed $2,198,929 in Spain and $1,199,024 in Italy.  In the United States, Goya's Ghosts has grossed $1,000,626, with a worldwide total $9,448,082.

Critical reception
Goya's Ghosts received poor reviews from critics. The review aggregator Rotten Tomatoes reported that 30% of critics gave the film positive reviews, based on 87 reviews — with the consensus that "ornate costumes and a talented cast can't make up for Ghosts' glacial pace and confused plot." Metacritic reported the film had an average score of 52 out of 100, based on 25 reviews — indicating average reviews.

Comparisons to the Iraq War
Although Forman said the script was finished before the Iraq War started, the movie was seen as critical of the U.S. role. U.S. Vice President Dick Cheney quoted Napoleon before the war, saying we would be seen as liberators, a line which Forman said was already in the script. Forman said he wanted to depict the "interesting fact that Napoleon brought the seeds of democracy to Spain, but at the time it wasn't enough." Forman said the same thing was happening in Iraq; "We are planting the right seeds in the wrong soil. This soil is not yet fertilized enough for these seeds to grow." The film's first scene, with the priests looking at Goya's apparently scandalous work and saying "This is how the world sees us", could be compared to the Abu Ghraib scandal.

References

External links
 Official website (archived) 
 Hanway Films webpage
 John Walker. (2009). "Goya's ghosts (Los phantasmas de Goya) (2006) film review . artdesigncafe.
 
 
 
 
 
 "Liberty, Equality and Torture," in Willamette Week By N.P. Thompson
 Photos at natalieportman.com

2006 drama films
2006 films
Biographical films about painters
Cultural depictions of Francisco Goya
English-language Spanish films
Films about Catholicism
Films directed by Miloš Forman
Films produced by Saul Zaentz
Films set in 1792
Films set in the 1800s
Films set in the 1810s
Films set in Spain
Films shot in Madrid
Films with screenplays by Jean-Claude Carrière
Films with screenplays by Miloš Forman
Inquisition in fiction
Peninsular War films
Spanish Inquisition
Warner Bros. films
2000s Spanish films